The 2021 Continental Cup was a Twenty20 International (T20I) cricket tournament that took place at the Moara Vlasiei Cricket Ground in Ilfov County, Romania, in the first week of September 2021. Austria won the previous edition in 2019, but did not defend the title in 2021. The participating nations were the hosts Romania, along with Bulgaria, Czech Republic, Hungary, Luxembourg and Malta. Hungary played their first ever official T20I match during the tournament. The teams were split into two groups, with the top two in each group progressing to the semi-finals.

Luxembourg topped Group A to set up a semi-final against Hungary, while Romania    earned a semi-final against Malta after winning Group B. Luxembourg and Romania advanced to the final by winning their semi-final matches, while the Czech Republic finished in fifth place after defeating Bulgaria in a play-off. On the last day of the tournament, Romania defeated Luxembourg in the final by 33 runs, before Hungary secured third place with a comfortable eight-wicket win over Malta.

Squads

Group stage

Group A

Group B

Playoffs

5th place playoff

Semi-finals

1st Semi-final

2nd Semi-final

3rd place playoff

Final

References

External links
 Series home at ESPN Cricinfo

Associate international cricket competitions in 2021